Arsinoes Chaos is a chaos terrain in the Margaritifer Sinus quadrangle on Mars.  It is 200 km in diameter. Its location is 7.66 °S and 27.9 °W.  Arsinoes Chaos was named after Arsinoe, a queen of ancient Egypt, daughter of Ptolemy and Berenice.

Chaos terrain on Mars is distinctive; nothing on Earth compares to it.  Chaos terrain generally consists of irregular groups of large blocks, some tens of kilometres across and a hundred or more meters high.  The tilted and flat topped blocks form depressions hundreds of metres deep.  A chaotic region can be recognized by a rat's nest of mesas, buttes, and hills, chopped through with valleys which in places look almost patterned.  Some parts of this chaotic area have not collapsed completely—they are still formed into large mesas, so they may still contain water ice. 

Some buttes and mesas in Arsinoes display layering.  Many places on Mars show rocks arranged in layers. Rock can form layers in a variety of ways.  Volcanoes, wind, or water can produce layers.  Layers can be hardened by the action of groundwater.  Martian ground water probably moved hundreds of kilometers, and in the process it dissolved many minerals from the rock it passed through.  When ground water surfaces in low areas containing sediments, water evaporates in the thin atmosphere and leaves behind minerals as deposits and/or cementing agents. Consequently, layers of dust could not later easily erode away since they were cemented together. On Earth, mineral-rich waters often evaporate forming large deposits of various types of salts and other minerals.   

A detailed discussion of layering with many Martian examples can be found in Sedimentary Geology of Mars.

Gallery

References

See also
 List of areas of chaos terrain on Mars

Chaotic terrains on Mars
Margaritifer Sinus quadrangle